Ozero is a rural locality (a selo) in Sikiyazsky Selsoviet, Duvansky District, Bashkortostan, Russia. The population was 629 as of 2010. There are 8 streets.

Geography 
Ozero is located 13 km southwest of Mesyagutovo (the district's administrative centre) by road. Sikiyaz is the nearest rural locality.

References 

Rural localities in Duvansky District